Kotu can refer to:

 a Matoran character in Bionicle storyline
 a minor, but traditionally important island in Tonga. See Kotu Island
 Kotu, Ethiopia
 a town in The Gambia, near Serekunda, the most populous city. See Kotu, The Gambia
 Kings of the Universe, the name for the men's team on the eighth season of The Apprentice.
 KOTU-LP, a low-power radio station (107.7 FM) licensed to serve Riddle, Oregon, United States